Argentina first completed and won its first  medal at the Deaflympics in 1965. Since then Argentina has been regularly participating at the Deaflympics. Argentina has never competed at the Winter Deaflympics.

Medal tallies

Summer Deaflympics

See also 
Argentina at the Paralympics
Argentina at the Olympics

References 

Nations at the Deaflympics
Parasports in Argentina
Argentina at multi-sport events
Deaf culture in Argentina